is a Japanese footballer currently playing as a goalkeeper for Nagano Parceiro.

Career statistics

Club
.

Notes

References

1998 births
Living people
Sportspeople from Osaka Prefecture
Association football people from Osaka Prefecture
Japanese footballers
Association football goalkeepers
J3 League players
AC Nagano Parceiro players